Pelagodes clarifimbria is a moth of the family Geometridae first described by Prout in 1919. It is found in Sri Lanka, Peninsular Malaysia and Borneo.

The adult has bluish-green wings. In male genitalia, socii are broad, well developed gnathos with the lateral arms strongly expanded, tongue like.

References

Moths of Asia
Moths described in 1919